Barilari is a project band from Argentina fronted by the Rata Blanca vocalist Adrián Barilari. The band formed in 2001 due to Adrian's wishes to form a solo project away from the demands of his other bands. In 2003 he invited musicians from Nightwish and Jens Johansson from Stratovarius to be part of the line-up of his first album.

History

Beginning and Demo (2001–2002)
A demo was released in 2001.
This demo has four songs

01. Amo de la Oscuridad (Master of the Dark)
02. La Gran Victoria (Your Private Conquest)
03. Fuera de Aqui (Get out from Here)
04. Heaven and Hell (Black Sabbath)

Barilari (2003–2004)
The band's first album; which was self-titled, was released during the latter part of 2003. The lineup of the band at this time was only for recording purposes and therefore sessional members were used for live concerts. Both English and Spanish versions of the album were produced and sold commercially.

Track listings

Canciones Doradas (2007)
The second album, Canciones Doradas was released in September 2007.  It is a covers album featuring songs originally performed by Robbie Williams, Aerosmith, Sting and Bon Jovi.

Adrian features on the compilation album Women for Life- Live which was released in Argentina in 2007.  All proceeds from the album went towards financing charities which help women in Latin America who are affected by HIV and AIDS.

Abuso de Poder (2009–2010)
Recently the third album "Abuso de Poder" was released, the free album can be downloaded from www.dontpaymusic.com

Personnel
Current line-up
Adrián Barilari - Vocals (2001–Present)
Julián Barrett - Guitars (2009–Present)
Piter Barrett - Bass (2009–Present)
Nicolás Polo - Drums (2009–Present)

Session musicians (2003-2004)
Emppu Vuorinen - Guitars
Sami Vänskä - Bass
Jukka Nevalainen - Drums
Jens Johansson- Keyboards
Gonzalo Ledesma - Guitar
Daniel Telis - Guitar
Rubén Yáñez - Bass
Jorge Perini - Drums
Leonardo Palmieri - Keyboards

Discography

EPs
Barilari - Demo, 2001	
Barilari - EP, 2003

Studio albums
Barilari (English and Spanish versions) - 2003
Canciones Doradas - 2007
Abuso De Poder - 2009

DVDs
Barilari En Vivo - DVD 2006

Collaborations
 Azeroth - 2001
La Cosecha Del Dolor - Single, 2003 (Blind Guardian)

Website Links
Official site

Argentine progressive rock groups